Rawalakot is the capital of Poonch district in Azad Kashmir, Pakistan. It is located in the Pir Panjal Range.

History 

Along with Pallandri, Rawalakot was the focal point of the 1955 Poonch uprising. It was led by the local Sudhans who disapproved of Sher Ahmed Khan and wanted Sardar Ibrahim Khan, as well as democratic reforms.

2005 Kashmir earthquake 
On Saturday, 8 October 2005 a 7.6 magnitude earthquake killed 73,338 people and left up to three million homeless in Pakistan, including Azad Kashmir. The city of Rawalakot, the capital of the Poonch, suffered significant damage from the 2005 Kashmir earthquake; although most of the buildings were left standing, many of them were rendered uninhabitable, and some of the population was left homeless. Most of the buildings have been reconstructed.

Location
Rawalakot is located at Latitude 33°51'32.18"N, Longitude 73° 45'34.93"E and an Elevation of 5374 feet. It is linked with Rawalpindi and Islamabad via Goyain Nala and Tain roads. Via Kotli Satiyan and Kahuta. It is also linked with Rawalpindi via Sudhnuti.

Transport

Travel routes
Construction of the Ghazi-e-Millat road (also known as Guoien Nala road) between Rawalakot and Azad Pattan has considerably reduced travel time, it is main road which is connecting Islamabad/Rawalpindi to Rawalakot city.

Road links
The road passing through Pakgali-Paniola connects Rawalakot to Bagh, Rawalpindi and Muzaffarabad. The alternative road that passes through Mohri Farman Shah, Shuja Abad is the shortest possible road link that connects Rawalakot city with Bagh. Murree, Islamabad and Rawalpindi are situated in a southward direction from Rawalakot. The town has another road link with Kotli.

Rawalakot Airport is non-operational and it has been closed since 1998.

Climate 
Rawalakot features a subtropical highland climate under the Köppen climate classification due to high altitude. The weather of Rawalakot is quite erratic. However, the climate of Rawalakot can be divided into four seasons, namely spring, summer, autumn and winter. Rawalakot has mild to warm temperatures during the spring and autumn, humid temperatures during the summer and cold to snowy during the winter. The temperature can rise as high as  during the mid-summer months and drop below  during the winter months. Snowfall occurs in December and January, while most rainfall occurs during the monsoon season stretching from July to September.

Demography 
Rawalakot has an urban population of 56,006 people according to the 2017 census which rose to 56,590 in 2018.

Notes

References

External links

Britannica – Azad Kashmir
World atlas page about Azad Kashmir status

2005 Kashmir earthquake
Populated places in Poonch District, Pakistan
Tehsils of Poonch District